Betamethasone valerate is a synthetic glucocorticoid ester. It is the 17-valerate ester of betamethasone. Betamethasone valerate is often used to treat mild eczema with good efficacy and lower incidence of steroid induced adverse effects due to its lower potency compared to other glucocorticoids. Betamethasone-17-valerate is available in cream, ointment, lotion, and foam preparations for topical use.

See also 
 Fusidic acid/betamethasone valerate

References 

Corticosteroid esters
Glucocorticoids
Valerate esters